Evan Evagora is an Australian actor. He is best known for his role as the Romulan Elnor on the television series Star Trek: Picard (2020present).

Biography

Early life
Evagora was born in Melbourne, the youngest of seven children born to Marie and Xristos. His parents both migrated to Australia: his mother, who is of Cook Islands Māori descent, from New Zealand when she was 20, and his father from Cyprus when he was three.

Evagora grew up in Melbourne, where he went to Kew High School. His interests at school included sport, particularly boxing and Australian rules football. He also took an interest in theatre, writing a play in which he took the part of Rove McManus.

Evagora appeared to be destined for a sports career. He won a state boxing championship, and played for Fitzroy Football Club in both Victorian Amateur Football Association and Victorian Football Association games. After school he spent a year travelling around Europe with friends. Evagora then went to film school in South Melbourne.

Career
While at film school Evagora was scouted as a model by a company that represents models and actors, and later moved to Sydney for his acting and then to Los Angeles.

Evagora played the role of Nick Taylor in the film Fantasy Island which was released in February 2020.

Evagora has a starring role in Star Trek: Picard as Elnor, a Romulan hand-to-hand combat expert. He is the first Australian to be a regular cast member in a Star Trek TV series. His role quickly received a "Space Legolas" nickname from Internet users, based on similarities with the character from The Lord of the Rings films, including the name style.

In an Australian magazine interview published in November 2019, Evagora said he would be filming in season 2 of Star Trek: Picard in 2020.

Filmography

Film

Television

Video games

References

External links

 
 

Living people
21st-century Australian male actors
Male actors from Melbourne
Australian male film actors
Australian male television actors
Australian male models
Year of birth missing (living people)
Australian people of Cook Island descent
Australian people of Greek Cypriot descent